Kitayama Station is the name of multiple train stations in Japan.

Kitayama Station (Aichi) - (喜多山駅) in Aichi Prefecture
Kitayama Station (Ehime) - (喜多山駅) in Ehime Prefecture
Kitayama Station (Kōchi) - (北山駅) in Kōchi Prefecture
Kitayama Station (Kyoto) - (北山駅) in Kyoto
Kitayama Station (Miyagi) - (北山駅) in Miyagi Prefecture
Kitayama Station (Tochigi) - (北山駅) in Tochigi Prefecture